An essay mill (also term paper mill) is a business that allows customers to commission an original piece of writing on a particular topic so that they may commit academic fraud. Customers provide the company with specific information about the essay, including: a page length, a general topic, and a time frame with which to work. The customer is then charged a certain amount per page. The similar essay bank concept is a company from which students can purchase pre-written but less expensive essays on various topics, at higher risk of being caught. Both forms of business are under varying legal restraints in some jurisdictions.

History
The idea behind term paper mills can be dated back to the mid-nineteenth century in which "paper reservoirs" were located in the basements of fraternity houses. Otherwise known as "fraternity files," these essay banks were practices in which students shared term papers and submitted work that had been done by other students. These essay banks inspired the commercialization of ghostwritten essay-writing practices. As early as the 1950s, advertisements circulating in college campuses described services that included ghostwritten work for dissertations, theses, and term papers.

In conjunction with this practice, the changing attitudes of students in the 1960s and 1970s started to stray away from diligent and engaged course work because they saw an emphasis on the benefits of community involvement. A new focus on activities outside of the classroom took away from time to focus on class work, thus promoting these writing services throughout college campuses.

Soon, actual businesses were providing custom-written essays for students in exchange for compensation. They were located near college campuses. One could walk into a building and peruse pricing pamphlets,  speak to someone directly to place an order, or possibly make a selection from a vault of recycled research papers stored in the basement of these businesses.

Products and services
"Essay mill" companies hire university students, graduates, and professional writers to ghostwrite essays and term papers, and solicit business from university and college students by posting advertisements. Until the early 1990s, most essay mill companies were 'bricks and mortar' businesses offering their services by mail-order or from offices located in university or college towns. By the 2000s, most essay mill businesses had switched to an e-commerce business model, soliciting business and selling essays using an Internet website.  Companies often provide free sample essays on popular topics to attract Internet searches.

To obtain an essay, a customer usually submits a form that describes the assignment that he or she wants completed, how many pages it needs to be, and when it needs to be completed by. On the opposite end of the transaction, the employee searches through requests until he or she finds something that looks interesting, that he or she can write quickly and that will satisfy the page requirement. It does not matter if the writer has previous knowledge about the subject; if it is easy to research, he or she will get the job done.

Depending on how much a student pays an essay mill, a student can receive a number of different products. The most expensive of these products would be a full-written essay (or even a dissertation) that a student can turn in. Requested papers can follow specific guidelines laid out by the student including the use of a certain amount of sources, a preselected topic, and the receiving of specific grade by the student. Some students may request to receive a high mark on a purchased essay in order to boost their Grade Point Average (GPA), while some may deliberately order an essay that will give them a "C" in order to reduce suspicion of academic fraud. One of the cheaper options an essay mill might offer is just a detailed outline of information a student should include in an essay that a student will write themselves. Due to the minimalist nature of this type of transaction, it can be very difficult for schools to catch this type of paid academic assistance.

Similar to essay mills, an essay bank is a company where students can go to purchase pre-written essays.  Due to the nature of essay bank essays, students may find themselves more likely to be caught for committing academic dishonesty. As a result of this, essay bank essays in general may cost less than those from essay mills.

Legal status

The first major legal battle against an essay mill came in 1972 in the case of State of New York v. .  This case involved the state challenging an essay mill's business with reference to the New York Education Law.  The law "condemns the obtaining of a degree by fraudulent means or 'aiding and abetting' another to do the same." The state claimed that the students were using the term papers they purchased for credit and even though the company stated that the essays they wrote were for research purposes only, their advertising scheme encouraged otherwise by boasting about grades. The court determined that the disclaimers did not sufficiently protect the company because their encouragement of cheating and plagiarism hurt the educational system.  The ruling called for the company to cease business in the State of New York. Several other legal battles have been fought since and have largely resulted in the punishment of the term paper writers rather than the students purchasing them.

California Education Code Section 66400 "penalizes the preparation or sale of term papers, theses, or dissertations for compensation ...." The law is applicable when the preparer/seller knew or should have known that the recipient would submit the paper for academic credit.  State residents or academic institutions "acting for the interest of itself, its students, or the general public" can file suit against offenders for "any relief as is necessary." This law differs from that of New York in various ways, including holding the vendor responsible even if it claims that the paper was not intended to be turned in for credit, if the court concludes that it should have known that it would, or if the claim is not credible. For example, while some essay mills state that their products are not intended to be submitted for credit, they may also boast of the high grades that their papers have received.

The 2011 Florida Statutes Section 877.17 states that it is a second degree misdemeanor to "sell, offer to sell, or advertise for sale" a "written, recorded, pictorial, artistic, or other assignment" to another for submission "unaltered to a substantial degree." In the state of Florida, second degree misdemeanors are punishable by up to sixty days in prison.

Criticism and controversy
The academic community has criticized essay mill companies for helping students to commit academic fraud.

Some essay mills have defended themselves against criticism by claiming that they are selling pre-written examples which students can use as guidelines and models for the student's own work. In 2002, a UK-based essay mill called Elizabeth Hall Associates required students purchasing essays to sign a disclaimer stating that "any material provided by Elizabeth Hall Associates [is] on the understanding that it is a guidance model only." Other essay mills claim that they are "scholarly publishing houses" that provide students with essays that the student can then cite in the student's own work.

Students from different academic backgrounds have used essay mills.  Many prestigious universities and colleges have caught their students turning in papers they bought from essay mills.  The University of California, San Diego caught 600 students cheating in one year.  One of the forms of cheating was turning in papers bought from essay mills.

Using term paper mills brings up some ethical controversies.  Some people view essay mills as unethical while others view it as completely moral.  People view essay mills as ethical for different reasons.  Some customers indicate that they use essay mills as a form of proof reading.  Essay mill writers will read their writing only to make comments and feedback about content and grammar mistakes.  They also turn to essay mills to insure that all citations are correct.  Some customers claim that they turn to essay mills because society has put too much pressure on students to achieve academic success. GPAs and grades are greatly stressed in schools which causes students to worry and make them feel like they cannot meet their deadlines. In order to get the paper handed in on time, students seek out term paper mills.  Essay mills have been compared to business situations.  Certain students and customers view term paper mills as equivalent to companies outsourcing labor.  Outsourcing labor is a norm for businesses which insinuates that the use of term paper mills should be socially acceptable.

Conversely, there are people who view purchasing essays from essay mills as unethical: it is a form of cheating and plagiarism because one person is taking credit for another individual's work.  Academic institutions are concerned about how essay mills affect learning.  Students who use essay mills do not go through the process of gathering research, which is a learning experience in itself.  Some professors, such as Dan Ariely, a professor of psychology and behavioral economics at Duke University and the author of The (Honest) Truth About Dishonesty, worry about the message that term paper mills send to students.  He believes that the existence of essay mills encourages laziness to be seen as acceptable.  Ariely found essay mills that use plagiarism-encouraging language on their websites.

Students generally know that using essay mill services is unethical; according to a study conducted by Patrick Scanlon and David Neumann, 90% of students surveyed admitted that the practice is unethical. The same study showed that students believe around 20% of their peers frequently use these online services.

Many customers believe that when they are ordering an essay online, that they are going to be receiving one from their own country; however, this is not always the case, as essay mill companies are hosted around the world. Not only are many of the essay mill companies hosted overseas, but many of the writers for these companies do not have graduate degrees, and have learned English as their second language.

Having essay mills set up internationally allows for the owners of these companies to make high profits by paying wages in low-wage countries while selling the work of their employees in high-wage countries. A 2009 article in The Chronicle of Higher Education stated that overseas writers only get paid between $1 and $3 per page out of the $20 to $30 US-customers pay per page. Compared to US-based writers that work for essay mills, this is a very low rate. Another article in The Chronicle of Higher Education from 2010 interviewed an American essay mill writer, who stated that he receives half of the money paid by a client for a paper.

Within the US, the amount that writers are paid varies by up to a factor of five . Some US writers earn around $1,000 per month in their highest paying months, which, is a low wage. Some of the better writers are able to earn up to $5,000 per month.

Strategies for combating academic fraud
Universities and colleges have developed several strategies to combat this type of academic misconduct. Some professors require students to submit electronic versions of their term papers, so that the text of the essay can be compared by anti-plagiarism software (such as Turnitin) against databases of known "essay mill" term papers, and new software called Authorship Investigate, also by Turnitin, can look at a paper and compare it against a student's other writings to yield a probabilistic estimate of whether the student is the real author.

Other universities have enacted rules allowing professors to give students oral examinations on papers which a professor believes to be ghostwritten; if the student is unfamiliar with the content of an essay that  he has submitted, or its sources, then the student can be charged with academic fraud, a violation of the rules by which a student agrees to be bound when he enters a university or college program.

When a student is charged with academic fraud, his case is typically heard by a quasi-judicial administrative committee, which reviews the evidence. For students who are found guilty, the punishments range from a grade of zero on the specific assignment, to failure in the course in which the plagiarism occurred, to (in extreme or repeated cases) suspension or expulsion from the institution. In some cases, students who have committed academic fraud may also have academic honors, degrees, or awards revoked.

See also
 Author's editor
 Author mill
 Accreditation mill
 Diploma mill
 Ordination mill 
 Plagiarism
 Contract cheating
Research paper mill

References

Further reading 
 

Cheating in school
Educational assessment and evaluation
Fraud
Academic terminology
Plagiarism in science
Ghostwriting in science
Deception